Ignalin may refer to the following places:
Ignalin, Greater Poland Voivodeship (west-central Poland)
Ignalin, Kuyavian-Pomeranian Voivodeship (north-central Poland)
Ignalin, Warmian-Masurian Voivodeship (north Poland)